Kurenurme is a village in Võru Parish, Võru County, in southeastern Estonia. As of 2000 it had a population of 73.

Kurenurme was founded as a lumberjack village in the beginning of the 19th century.

Kurenurme kool was founded in 1931, it was closed in 2001.

Kurenurme has a station on currently inactive Valga–Pechory railway.

References

Villages in Võru County